Estêvão Barreto de Oliveira (born 3 February 2002), simply known as Estêvão, is a Brazilian professional footballer who plays as a midfielder for Internacional.

Club career
Born in Amambai, Mato Grosso do Sul, Estêvão began his career with São Paulo's youth setup at the age of eight. He later spent four years at Santos before joining Internacional in 2016. He signed a professional deal with the latter club on 3 September 2018.

Estêvão made his professional – and Série A – debut on 1 May 2022, coming on as a second-half substitute for Wanderson in a 0–0 home draw against Avaí.

Career statistics

References

External links
Internacional profile 

2002 births
Living people
Sportspeople from Mato Grosso do Sul
Brazilian footballers
Association football midfielders
Campeonato Brasileiro Série A players
Sport Club Internacional players